Fuller Weidner Thompson (June 1, 1889 – February 19, 1972) was a Major League Baseball pitcher. He played one season with the Boston Rustlers in 1911.

References

External links

Boston Rustlers players
1889 births
1972 deaths
Baseball players from Los Angeles
Major League Baseball pitchers
Wittenberg Tigers baseball players
Elmira Colonels players
Los Angeles High School alumni